{{Speciesbox
| taxon = Conasprella wakayamaensis
| image = Conus acutangulus.JPG
| image_caption = Apertural view of shell of 'Conasprella wakayamaensis Petuch, 1979, trawled at 150 meters off Aliguay Island in the Philippines
| authority =  (Kuroda, 1956)
| synonyms_ref = 
| synonyms =
 Asprella wakayamaensis Kuroda, 1956 (original combination)
 Conasprella (Conasprella) wakayamaensis (Kuroda, 1956) · accepted, alternate representation
 Conus nereis Petuch, 1979
 Conus wakayamaensis (Kuroda, 1956)
| display_parents = 3
}}Conasprella wakayamaensis''' is a species of sea snail, a marine gastropod mollusk in the family Conidae, the cone snails and their allies.

Like all species within the genus Conasprella, these snails are predatory and venomous. They are capable of "stinging" humans, therefore live ones should be handled carefully or not at all.

Description
The size of the shell varies between 24 mm and 33 mm.

Distribution
This marine species occurs off Taiwan and Japan; also in the Bismarck Sea off Papua New Guinea

References

 Tucker J.K. & Tenorio M.J. (2009) Systematic classification of Recent and fossil conoidean gastropods. Hackenheim: Conchbooks. 296 pp. 
 Tucker J.K. & Tenorio M.J. (2013) Illustrated catalog of the living cone shells. 517 pp''. Wellington, Florida: MdM Publishing.
 Puillandre N., Duda T.F., Meyer C., Olivera B.M. & Bouchet P. (2015). One, four or 100 genera? A new classification of the cone snails. Journal of Molluscan Studies. 81: 1–23

External links
 The Conus Biodiversity website
Cone Shells – Knights of the Sea
 

wakayamaensis
Gastropods described in 1956